Asti is an unincorporated community in Sonoma County, California, United States. It is located near U.S. Route 101 in the Alexander Valley between Cloverdale, Geyserville and Healdsburg, and was named after the city in northern Italy (toponym in Italian instead of Piedmontese)

In 1881, Andrea Sbarboro established two communities, Asti and Chianti, as part of his Italian Swiss Agricultural Colony.  A plaque at the southeast corner of Asti Road and Asti Post Office Road commemorates the colony, whose wines won ten gold medals in international competition.  The colony is California Historical Landmark #621.

Located in the Alexander Valley AVA, Asti is the home of Asti Winery. By the mid-1950s, it had become the second-most-visited destination in California, after Disneyland.

Asti had a post office which closed in 1978. It used the ZIP Code 95413. The community is now served by Cloverdale's ZIP Code, 95425.

Climate
This region experiences warm (but not hot) and dry summers, with no average monthly temperatures above .  According to the Köppen Climate Classification system, Asti has a warm-summer Mediterranean climate, abbreviated "Csb" on climate maps.

Gallery

See also
 Northwestern Pacific Railroad

References

External links
 LeBaron: Wine and laughter in Asti

History of Sonoma County, California
Populated places established in 1881
Unincorporated communities in California
Unincorporated communities in Sonoma County, California
1881 establishments in California